is a mountain in Snowdonia, Wales, the highest peak in the Glyderau range at just over 1,000 metres, having had its height recalculated in 2010 using GPS. It is the fifth-highest mountain in Wales and has several walking and scrambling routes leading to its summit. According to Sir Ifor Williams, the word "" derives from the Welsh word "", meaning a heap of stones.

Geography
Glyder Fawr is part of the Glyderau mountain range which lies to the northeast of the Snowdon massif, separated from that mountain by the Llanberis Pass and the Nant Peris Valley. Going from west to east, the Glyderau range consists of Elidir Fawr, Y Garn, Glyder Fawr, Glyder Fach and Tryfan. To the north of the range lie the Carneddau, separated from the Glyderau by the Ogwen Valley and the Nant Ffrancon Valley. The Glyderau are separated from the surrounding mountain ranges making them stand out clearly from afar and giving them commanding views of the surrounding peaks and valleys. Until late 2010, most maps showed the height of Glyder Fawr to be ; however, the mountain was resurveyed with accurate GPS equipment and its height was found to be . A spokesman from the Snowdonia National Park Authority was pleased by the new height, and suggested that now the mountain exceeded 1,000 m, it was sure to attract more walkers to the area.

The Glyderau range was formed about five hundred million years ago, when two land masses collided, causing the Snowdonia massif to rise up. Since then, wind, water and frost, and the advance and retreat of glaciers during the ice ages have gradually worn down the mountains to their present proportions. The underlying rock is a mixture of volcanic and sedimentary material. The ice sheet of the most recent ice age retreated about ten thousand years ago leaving Cwm Idwal as an example of a cirque. The ice scarred the surrounding cliffs, hollowed out the bed of Llyn Idwal and dumped rocks and other material that formed moraines at its foot. Massive boulders and shattered rocks crashed down from above to form the boulder fields and screes visible today.

Routes to the summit
The summit can be accessed from several directions: one route starts at Ogwen Cottage on the shores of Llyn Idwal and approaches the mountain from the north; another starts at Pen-y-Pass and approaches it from the south; another possibility is to approach it from the east along the ridge from Glyder Fach. Although there is much shattered stone near the summit of Glyder Fach, the ridge between the two summits is fairly level and easy going. A scrambling, circuit route encompasses the three summits of Tryfan, Glyder Fach and Glyder Fawr and takes six or seven hours. One of the most popular routes from Ogwen Cottage follows the shore of Llyn Idwal to the base of the famous Rhiwiau Caws (Idwal Slabs) rock climbing crag, it then makes its way out of the cwm via the steep Twll Du path, arriving at a small lake called Llyn Y Cŵn. From here a steep scree path ascends the western shoulder to the summit of Glyder Fawr.

Management
The National Trust took over the management of the Glyderau and the Carneddau in 1951 in lieu of death duties on the Penrhyn Estate. The total area is about 7,000 hectares, half of which is common land with registered grazing rights for 45,000 sheep and 741 ponies. There are eight tenanted farms on the estate, and the National Trust is responsible for the maintenance of footpaths and drystone walls, some of which date back many hundreds of years. The two mountain ranges form part of the Snowdonia National Park.

References

External links
 Computer generated summit panoramas North South Index
 Walking Route up Glyder Fawr via Tryfan  Walk Eryri
 www.geograph.co.uk : photos of Glyder Fawr

Hewitts of Wales
Marilyns of Wales
Nuttalls
Mountains and hills of Snowdonia
Tourism in Gwynedd
Mountains and hills of Conwy County Borough
Landmarks in Wales
Furths
Mountains and hills of Gwynedd
Capel Curig
Llanberis
Llandygai
One-thousanders of Wales